The men's singles racquetball competition at the 2019 Pan American Games in Lima, Peru was held between August 2 and 7, 2019 at the Racquetball courts located at the Villa Deportiva Regional del Callao cluster. Rodrigo Montoya of Mexico won gold by defeating team-mate Alvaro Beltran in the final. This was the 1st gold medal in Men's Singles for a Mexican player in Racquetball at the Pan American Games. USA players had won gold at all previous Pan American Games, but in 2019 no USA players made the podium.

Schedule
All times are Central Standard Time (UTC-6).

Group stage

The competition begins with a round robin with athletes divided into groups. The top two athletes in each group advanced to the medal round. Groups was announced at the technical meeting the day before the competition begins.

Pool A

Pool B

Pool C

Pool D

Pool E

Pool F

Pool G

Playoffs

References

External links
Results book

Racquetball at the 2019 Pan American Games